Anchamps is a commune in the Ardennes department in the Grand Est region of northern France.

Geography 
Anchamps is located some 15 km south of Fumay and 12 km east of Rocroi on the left bank of the Meuse just east of the Orzy neighbourhood of Revin. Road access to the town is by a local road from Revin which follows the bank of the Meuse and a road bridge over the Meuse connects to the D1 road. The village is served by the TER train from Givet to Charleville-Mézières at a rate of 4 to 5 trains per day. The railway also follows the Meuse crossing over on the railway viaduct on the east side of the commune.

The Meuse river forms the border of the commune on the west, north, and east sides.

Neighbouring communes and villages

Toponymy 
Angehan (1400)
Engehan (1459)
Auchamp (1793)
Amchamps (1801)

According to JP Lépine, Anchamps was once written Enjean and Enchamp.

It probably derives from anacum: an meaning "river" and acum meaning "close" – i.e. "close to the river".

History 
In 1509 the village had only 12 fires, in 1728 – 18, and in 1846–59 fires or 235 inhabitants.

The origin of the village is unknown: it is as old as the village of Deville which has long depended on the Barony of Montcornet.

The inhabitants of Anchamps, like all communes from the Barony of Montcornet had to pay annual manorial dues which was two hens for each citizen; 18 deniers for the rights of the people; for the use of the river water for crushing (there used to be a crushing mill) 3 livres and 5 sols; 2 Paris sols and 6 eels for fishing the Meuse; 2 sols and 6 deniers per swathe of meadow; and 9 deniers per arpent of occupied land.

Following a charter dated 3 August and 27 July 1546, Charles de Croy gave the inhabitants of this village, and the villages of Deville, Laifour Secheval, and Mazures an extensive wood called Wèbes.

The Lordship of Anchamps was sold to César Bernier in 1578 and was reunited with the County of Lonny in 1663 with all manorial rights attached. On the sale and acquisition of the marquisate by the Duke of Meillaraie in 1674, the rights granted to the residents by Charles de Croy were retained and that purchaser even provided them forever by deed of 22 September 1679 with the responsibility to pay him 15 sols per arpent annually.

The last lord of this place was Louis-Marie-Charles, the Viscount of Salse, a knight and also Lord of Laifour.

The village church dates from 1766.

Administration 

List of Successive Mayors

Population

Sites and Monuments 

Site of the Pierre Roland
This site consists of two blocks of diorite. The first is specifically called Pierre Roland and is standing with the shape of an irregular pyramid. It rises to 1.4 m above ground and is probably buried 50 cm with, remarkably, 4 edges pointing to the sunrises and sunsets.

The other is lying 10 m to the northwest. Its dimensions: 1.77 x 0.67 x 0.37 m.

These stones are said to have been thrown by Satan from three rocks called the Ladies of Meuse at the famous Charlemagne's nephew, Roland, to force him to retreat. One of the three projectiles rolled into the Meuse, the other two landed at the feet of the hero.

See also 
Communes of the Ardennes department

References

External links 
Anchamps on the National Geographic Institute website 
Anchamps on Géoportail, National Geographic Institute (IGN) website 
Anchant on the 1750 Cassini Map

Communes of Ardennes (department)